The Battle of Krasos was a battle in the Arab–Byzantine Wars that took place in August 804, between the Byzantines under Emperor Nikephoros I (r. 802–811) and an Abbasid army under Ibrahim ibn Jibril. Nikephoros' accession in 802 resulted in a resumption of warfare between Byzantium and the Abbasid Caliphate. In late summer 804, the Abbasids had invaded Byzantine Asia Minor for one of their customary raids, and Nikephoros set out to meet them. He was surprised, however, at Krasos and heavily defeated, barely escaping with his own life. A truce and prisoner exchange were afterwards arranged. Despite his defeat, and a massive Abbasid invasion the next year, Nikephoros persevered until troubles in the eastern provinces of the Caliphate forced the Abbasids to conclude a peace.

Background
The deposition of Empress Irene of Athens (r. 797–802) in October 802, and subsequent accession of Nikephoros I, signalled a more violent phase in the long history of the Arab–Byzantine Wars. Following a series of destructive annual raids across Asia Minor by the Caliphate, Irene seems to have secured a truce with Harun al-Rashid in 798 in exchange for the annual payment of tribute, repeating the terms agreed for a three-year truce following Harun's first large-scale campaign in 782. Nikephoros, on the other hand, was more warlike and determined to refill the imperial treasury by, among other measures, ceasing the tribute. Harun retaliated at once, launching a raid under his son al-Qasim. Nikephoros could not respond to this, as he faced an ultimately unsuccessful revolt of the Asian army under its commander-in-chief, Bardanes Tourkos. After disposing of Bardanes, Nikephoros assembled his army and marched out himself to meet a second, larger invasion under the Caliph himself. After Harun raided the frontier region, the two armies confronted each other for two months in central Asia Minor, but it did not come to a battle; Nikephoros and Harun exchanged letters, until the Emperor arranged for a withdrawal and a truce for the remainder of the year in exchange for a one-off payment of tribute.

Battle
In August 804, Harun dispatched another raid under his general Ibrahim ibn Jibril. The Arabs crossed into Asia Minor through the Cilician Gates and raided freely. Nikephoros set out to meet them, but was forced to return before he could do so due to some unspecified event at his back (Warren Treadgold surmises news of a possible conspiracy). On his march home, however, the Arabs launched a surprise attack at Krasos in Phrygia and defeated his army. The exact location of Krasos is unknown, but it was said to be a small plain along a road. According to al-Tabari, the Byzantines lost 40,700 men and 4,000 pack animals, while the Emperor himself was wounded three times. The Byzantine chronicler Theophanes the Confessor confirms that the imperial army lost many men and that Nikephoros was almost killed himself; saved only by the bravery of his officers.

Aftermath
Preoccupied with trouble in Khurasan, Harun now accepted tribute and made peace. An exchange of prisoners was also arranged and took place during the winter at the two empires' border, on the Lamos River in Cilicia; some 3,700 Muslims were exchanged for the Byzantines taken captive in the previous years. During Harun's absence in Khurasan, however, Nikephoros used the opportunity to rebuild the destroyed walls of the towns of Safsaf, Thebasa, and Ancyra. The following summer he launched the first Byzantine raid for two decades; into the Arab frontier district (thughur) in Cilicia. The Byzantine army raided and took prisoners as it went, even capturing the major Abbasid stronghold of Tarsus. At the same time, another Byzantine force raided the Upper Mesopotamian thughur and unsuccessfully besieged the fortress of Melitene, while a Byzantine-instigated rebellion against the local Arab garrison began in Cyprus. Harun retaliated with a massive invasion in 806, which forced Nikephoros to come to terms, but the Byzantine ruler soon violated them and prevailed over the Abbasid expeditions sent against him in 807. Following renewed trouble in Khurasan, a peace treaty was signed in 808 which left the Byzantine frontier zone intact and ended the payment of tribute to the Caliphate.

References

Sources

804
Battles involving the Abbasid Caliphate
Battles involving the Byzantine Empire
Battles in medieval Anatolia
Battles of the Arab–Byzantine wars
Harun al-Rashid
Phrygia
800s in the Byzantine Empire
9th century in the Abbasid Caliphate
Krasos